Sinagua High School was the third public district high school in Flagstaff, Arizona. It opened in 1989 and was closed in 2009. Three other schools were also closed at the same time.
The school's colors were royal blue and gray. The mascot was the Mustangs.

Closure
Sinagua's enrollment had remained steady for years between 960 and 1,070 students, but enrollment elsewhere, such as at Coconino High School, was falling. The Flagstaff Unified School District closed Sinagua and three other schools for a US $2 million cost savings; it also converted the Sinagua campus for use as a middle school to serve grades six through eight. Both schools received enrollment boosts, but Coconino absorbed the majority of Sinagua students in what was called "The Merge". Sinagua students at Coconino's 2011 graduation wore silver and blue tassels, and a class banner (a Sinagua tradition) featuring Sinagua blue, Coconino red, and purple was presented.

Notable alumni
 Katie Pavlich (2006), conservative political commentator and news editor of Townhall.com.

References

Former high schools in Arizona
Buildings and structures in Flagstaff, Arizona
Educational institutions established in 1989
Educational institutions disestablished in 2010
1989 establishments in Arizona
2010 disestablishments in Arizona
Schools in Coconino County, Arizona